Cesáreo Gabaráin (30 April 1936 – 20 April 1991) was a Spanish priest and composer of liturgical songs such as Pescador de hombres (Fisher of Men). He received a Gold Record award in Spain, and his music is well known and sung by English and Spanish-speaking people. Gabaráin became a hymn-writer when he was thirty and went on to write about five hundred songs. He tried to write songs that were easy to learn and be sung by the entire congregation. His hymns support moments of personal and communal prayer and praise to God.

Cesáreo Gabaráin was born in Hernani (Guipúzcoa) in 1936. In addition to music, from 1946 to 1952 he studied at the seminary in Zaragoza and at the Seminario Mayor de San Sebastian. He was ordained a priest in 1959. In the 1960s and 1970s, he was a chaplain at various colleges and nursing homes. In the 1980s, Gabaráin was an assistant priest in his parish in Madrid and head of a religious department at a college. In 1991 he died of cancer at the age of 55.

Named a chaplain prelate of Pope John Paul II, Cesáreo Gabaráin had 37 albums. He conducted workshops in 22 U.S. cities before his death in Anzuola in 1991. He ministered to cyclists participating in the Tour de France and other athletes.  Five of his hymns are in the United Methodist Hymnal, the most popular of which is “Fisher of Men.” This hymn, which features a well-loved gentle melody, was used in two movies. When a tour guide in Palestine said the hymn was written by Lake Tiberias, Cesáreo Gabaráin smiled because he had written it in Madrid. “Fisher of Men” has been translated into more than 80 languages.

Demos Gracias
After his death, a new verse to Demos gracias al Señor was sung by a children's choir: ". . . morning-time the birds sing the praises . . . and you my brother why don't you sing the praises . . . Let's give  thanks . . ." A youth pastor was playing his guitar and children were still singing a tune written in 22 years earlier, in 1973.

500 songs for evangelism 
After the Second Vatican Council (1962–65) permitted different styles of music, he was allowed a new freedom in hymn-writing style. His songs were often inspired by people he met and written with the intention to save more souls. He wrote about 500 songs as a teaching tool for church school and to help missionaries. Gabaráin's personal favorites were “Fisher of Men” and “Together Like Brothers,” owing to their popularity.

He met Pope John Paul II, who also liked “Fisher of Men”. The song was translated into English by Gertrude C. Suppe, George Lockwood and Raquel Gutiérrez-Achon as "Lord, You Have Come to the Lakeshore". The Polish version of the song ("Barka"), translated by Stanisław Szmidt, was especially popular.

Abuse accusations 

Gabaráin's noted contributions to church hymnody are now sullied by credible reports that he abused a number of young men when he was a chaplain at Colegio Marista in Chamberí. In August of 2021, the Spanish Daily El País reported on the incidents which took place in the late 1970s when Gabaráin was accused of child abuse which took place during his time as chaplain of the Colegio Chamberí which was run by the Marist Brothers, a religious community of which Gabaráin was a member at the time. Eduardo Mendoza, one of Gabaráin's students told his tutor about the abuse and this caused an investigation to be opened which resulted in Gabaráin being fired from the school and dismissed from the Marist brothers in 1978. Several other students have corroborated Mendoza's account and have shared their own accounts of being abused by Gabárain.

In response to these revelations of abuse Oregon Catholic Press (OCP), the designated distributor of Gabaráin's music in the US, has scrubbed any mention of Gabaráin from its website and is undergoing a process of reckoning regarding the presence of his works in their hymnals and other products.

See also 
 Wojciech Krolopp

References and external links

1936 births
1991 deaths
20th-century Spanish Roman Catholic priests
Composers of Christian music
Basque musicians
Deaths from cancer in Spain
20th-century composers
20th-century Spanish musicians